The 1965–66 Roller Hockey Champions Cup was the first edition of the Roller Hockey Champions Cup organized by CERH.

Voltregà was the first team to win this tournament.

Teams
The champions of the main European leagues played this competition, consisting in a double-legged knockout tournament.

Bracket

Source:

References

External links
 CERH website

1965 in roller hockey
1966 in roller hockey
Rink Hockey Euroleague